Mikuláš Athanasov (28 November 1930 – 26 December 2005) was a Czechoslovak wrestler. He was born in Košice. He won an Olympic bronze medal in Greco-Roman wrestling in 1952.

References

1930 births
2005 deaths
Sportspeople from Košice
Czechoslovak male sport wrestlers
Olympic wrestlers of Czechoslovakia
Wrestlers at the 1952 Summer Olympics
Czech male sport wrestlers
Olympic bronze medalists for Czechoslovakia
Olympic medalists in wrestling
Medalists at the 1952 Summer Olympics